Gerardo Emanuel Flores (born September 3, 1981), known professionally as Gerard Flores, is a singer/songwriter, producer and actor from Buenos Aires, Argentina.

Gerard was part of the number one program in Argentina, Susana Gimenez, recording more than 300 episodes for two consecutive years, while in the United States, Gerard has been a part of From Dusk Till Dawn: The Series, Harbinger: The Movie and Just Living: The Series, which received several awards. In 2020, the artist decided to start his solo career and during this time he released six singles.

Early life 

Born and raised in Buenos Aires, Gerard is the youngest of two children. He developed an interest in acting and music at a very young age. Although he was quite shy, he always managed to be part of the school exhibitions. But it wasn't after finishing high school that he was allowed to follow his dream. Gerard was lucky enough to enroll in a very prestigious art school run by one of the most relevant singers in Argentina, Valeria Lynch. She was the one who gave him his first big chance to be a part of a musical.

Television career 

Back home, Gerard had a successful career across television, theater and music. He was a daily cast member of the highest rated TV show in Argentina, Susana Giménez, recording more than 300 episodes over the span of multiple years. By the time his contract finished with the show, he was recording an electronic tango album 'Gayres' with his duet group 'Kurdha' under Avarecords/Warner Chappell Music Argentina. Prior to his TV career, Gerard toured throughout Argentina as part of the musical 'Lucia la Maga', directed by the celebrated singer Valeria Lynch. After 'Lucia la Maga', he went on to star in six different musicals, each touring throughout Argentina and Latin America.

Gerard left Argentina to take his career to new heights in the US. This move gave him the opportunity to be part of prestigious projects like 'From Dusk till Dawn: The Series' , 'Harbinger' , 'My Secret Lake' and many national and international commercials. Gerard has also written and produced his own Web-Series 'Just Living: The Web-Series', which was released on Prime Video and won multiple awards including 'Best Supporting Actor' and 'Best Director', awarded to Gerard Flores.

Musical career 
With a vision of bringing world-class performance to Latin pop music, he set out on the creation of his debut EP, produced by the Latin Grammy award-winner Trevor Muzzy. 'Esta Noche' was the first promotional single of his debut solo album. Released on March 5, 2020, the single has received very positive reviews from music critics like Billboard Argentina and PopSugar who praised his new sound and the energy on the song. Billboard editor wrote, "The song is a danceable track that catches you with it unique rhythms, which combines pop with EDM and a lyric that invites the listener to leave his or her problems aside to dance all night".

On August 20 of the same year and coming off the success of his debut single 'Esta Noche', Gerard released his first bilingual track, 'Lonely'. A unique fusion of pop, flamenco and reggaeton, 'Lonely' exudes sensuality and seduction. The theme of the song was inspired by the longing for human contact and while written before the COVID-19 pandemic, it was a very relevant and palpable message during 2020. “Despite our digital connectedness, people feel more alone than ever,” says Gerard. “The song celebrates the very human need to be together,” he added.

'Por Eso Te Amo', Gerard's third single, was released on December 3 of 2020. A romantic Ballad, full of feeling, with a story of a pure love that transcends the barriers of time, distance, culture and language. 'Por Eso Te Amo' music video expanded its parameters to include those with Hearing loss. Understanding that ballads can connect with audiences at a much deeper level, Gerard felt it was important that his new song be all inclusive and thus incorporated the written lyrics and Sign language to his music video. 'Por Eso Te Amo' music video was premiered on December 4 on one of the most prestigious morning shows in Latin America and USA called ¡Despierta América!, airing on Univision. The awareness Gerard brought to light about the lack of inclusivity in music videos, was covered extensively in the press. Billboard was one of them, once again, naming 'Por Eso Te Amo' one of the '5 Uplifting Moments in Latin Music of the Week (December 5, 2020)', Uforia Audio Network, People en Español, Los Angeles Times, Escuchaz.com, and Siempre Mujer were some of the media outlets that also supported 'Por Eso Te Amo' and its message of inclusivity. Gerard and his balad were also featured on 'En Casa con Telemundo' y 'Acceso Total', two of the most popular shows in Telemundo, were he also talked about bullying; a very personal topic and cause for him.
 
Gerard teamed up with some of the most successful creative in the music industry, he co-wrote 'Esta Noche', 'Lonely' and 'Por Eso Te Amo' with Swedish songwriter Aleena Gibson and Latin Grammy-winner producer and engineer Trevor Muzzy was at the helm of the EP production.

Artistry 
Gerard possesses the vocal range of a tenor. Gerard's work was influenced by his idol, Cher, but also by big stars like Ricky Martin, Jennifer Lopez, and Madonna. According to Gerard, his first crush was the singer and actress Thalía. He has even stated that her live performances were a huge motivation for him to follow a career in entertainment. Chayanne is also another artist that has influenced Gerard's work since the beginning of his career and it's not a casualty that the press has started to see him as his successor. PopSugar editor wrote, "He could definitely be a younger Chayanne — not that there's anything wrong with 50-year-old Chayanne. He definitely brings a distinct, fresh sound that fuses different sub genres of Latin music in a way that connects across cultural lines and language".

Gerard is known for pushing the envelope regarding social issues in all his videos. "'Esta Noche' celebrated dancers with different sexual orientations, 'Lonely' was all about the loneliness during the pandemic and now, with 'Por Eso Te Amo', Gerard brings the attention to people with hearing loss including the written lyrics and sign language on his music video", said Los Angeles Times. That's why he is considered an unapologetic maverick by many respected and important media outlets like People en Español that said, "Gerard Flores does with his music what no other singers dare to do" and the editor of Musical Notes Global who wrote: "Radiating incredible compassion and love, there is no doubt that Gerard Flores is on track to become one of the top Latin pop artists of the year, and will soon become an inspiring role model and a voice of optimism for anyone who is facing challenges of their own and needs to be reminded of the unique power that they carry with them inside". Another cause very important to Gerard is the fight against bullying. In many interviews, he mentioned being bullied for many years at school and how music was his savior. "I want my music to empower people, to make them feel beautiful and loved", he said.

Filmography

Film

Television

Discography

Studio albums 

 2009: Gayres

Singles 

 2020: Esta Noche
 2020: Lonely
 2020: Por Eso Te Amo

Awards 

 Best Supporting Actor for “Just Living: The Series” at The Actors Awards in L.A. (2017) 
 Best First Time Director for “Just Living: The Series” at Los Angeles Film Awards in L.A. (2017) 
 Best Director for “Just Living: The Series” at L.A. Shorts Awards in L.A. (2017) 
 Best Vocalist at the Fresh Fruit Festival in NYC. (2014)

References 

1981 births
Living people
Argentine male film actors
Argentine male television actors
Male actors from Buenos Aires
Warner Music Latina artists
People from Buenos Aires
Latin music musicians
Latin pop singers
Argentine male singers
Argentine pop singers
Argentine record producers
Argentine emigrants to the United States
Argentine male writers
Actors from Buenos Aires